Pogonocherus ovatoides is a species of beetle in the family Cerambycidae. It was described by Rapuzzi and Sama in 2014.

References

Pogonocherini
Beetles described in 2014